Whitehouse is an unincorporated community in Johnson County, Kentucky, United States. In its early years, it was called Mt. Carbon and housed families from two different coal companies, Sandy River Cannel Coal Company and Whitehouse Cannel Coal Company. In 1887, the Ohio and Big Sandy Railroad, bought by C&O Railroad in 1892, reached the community and named the station "Whitehouse" after a large white house that served as a landmark for riverboats. On April 23, 1887, the community named its post office Myrtle, but in 1901, both the post office and community were renamed Whitehouse, after the railroad station. Whitehouse's ZIP code is 41240.

References

Unincorporated communities in Johnson County, Kentucky
Unincorporated communities in Kentucky
Coal towns in Kentucky